Justus Ferdinand Christian Loder (12 March 1753 – 16 April 1832) was a German anatomist and surgeon who was a native of Riga.

Biography
In 1777 Loder earned his medical doctorate at the University of Göttingen, and the following year was appointed professor of surgery and anatomy at the University of Jena, where he practiced medicine for the next 25 years. At Jena he was responsible for the establishment of an anatomical theatre and an Accouchierhaus (maternity house). In 1780-81, at the expense of the Duke of Weimar, he took a scientific journey to France, England and Holland, a trip in which he made the acquaintance of several well-known physicians and scientists — Louis-Jean-Marie Daubenton, Jean-Louis Baudelocque, Félix Vicq-d'Azyr and John Hunter, among others.

In 1803 he transferred to the University of Halle, where he established a clinic of obstetrics. After the closing of the University of Halle by Napoleon in 1806, he became personal physician to the Prussian royal family at Königsberg. Later he relocated to Russia, where in 1810 he became personal physician to Czar Alexander I. Between 1814 and 1817 he was in charge of the military hospital in Moscow. He died in Moscow on 16 April 1832.

From 1794 to 1803 he published Tabulae anatomicae, which was a masterpiece containing a complete collection of anatomical illustrations of the human body. The work was one of the largest and most comprehensive anatomical atlases in its time. During his career, Loder maintained ongoing friendships with Christoph Wilhelm Hufeland and Johann Wolfgang von Goethe, both of whom had taken anatomy classes from Loder.

Written works 
 Anatomisches Handbuch, volume 1, 1788 (second edition- 1800).
 Anfangsgründe der chirurgischen Anthropologie und der Staatsarzneikunde, 1791 (third edition- 1800, (Rudiments of surgical anthropology and the state pharmacology).
 Chirurgisch-medicinische Beobachtungen, mehrentheils in der herzogl. Saxon-Weimar Krankenanstalt zu Jena gesammelt, volume 1- 1794.
 Tabulae anatomicae quas ad illustrandam humani corporis fabricam, (1794–1803).
 Grundriß der Anatomie des menschlichen Körpers. Zum Gebrauche bei Vorlesungen und Secir-Uebungen, volume 1- 1806 (Outline the anatomy of the human body; for use in lectures and exercises, dissections).
 Elementa anatomiae humani corporis, 1823.
 Index praeparatorum aliarumque rerum ad anatomen spectantium, quae in museo Caes. Universitatis Mosquensis servantur, 1823 (second edition- 1826).

References 
 Brief Essay on Loder's Tabulae anatomicae 
 XVIth Convention of the Julius-Hirschberg-Gesellschaft (biography)
 List of written works copied from the German Wikipedia.

German anatomists
German surgeons
1753 births
1832 deaths
Physicians from Riga
Academic staff of the University of Jena
Honorary members of the Saint Petersburg Academy of Sciences